U.S. Route 50 (US-50) in Utah crosses the center of the state. The highway serves no major population centers in Utah, with the largest city along its path being Delta. Most of the route passes through desolate, remote areas. Through the eastern half of the state the route is concurrent with Interstate 70 (I-70). US-50 both enters and exits Utah concurrent with US-6, however the two routes are separate through the center of the state.

Three completely different routings of US-50 have existed between Green River and Ely, Nevada. The route between these cities has become progressively shorter as new roads have been paved through this largely uninhabited region of both states. The earlier routings were a result of a dispute between Utah and Nevada over which auto trails would be paved and converted to U.S. Highways.

Route description
The highway enters Utah from Nevada in a desolate portion of the Great Basin Desert. Similar to many portions of the route in Nevada, there are multiple stretches without any motorist services. While passing through the Great Basin the highway crosses two mountain ranges, the Confusion Range via King's Canyon, and House Range via Skull Rock Pass, before arriving at the shore of Sevier Lake, an intermittent lake fed by snow melt from many mountain ranges in the eastern half of the Great Basin. The highway follows the north shore of Sevier Lake and the Sevier River towards Delta. Today much of the water in the Sevier river is diverted for agricultural use before reaching the lake, and rarely is significant water visible in the lake.

The scenery changes as US-50 approaches Delta, where U.S. Route 6 and 50 separate. As the road approaches Delta, a straight passage across desert becomes zigzags through farming areas. The highway continues to zigzag through farms until arriving at more mountainous terrain at Holden. At Holden, the highway merges with Interstate 15 to cross the Pavant Range via Scipio Summit. After passing the mountains, US-50 then separates from this freeway as again a two lane road passing through desolate territory towards Salina where the road joins with Interstate 70. The two highways run concurrent from this point east to Colorado.

While co-routed with I-70, US-50 crosses the Wasatch Plateau and passes through the San Rafael Swell. The construction of I-70 through the swell is noted as one of the engineering marvels of the Interstate Highway System. One specific feat, the excavation through a portion called Spotted Wolf Canyon, required excavating  of rock to have a bed for just  of roadway. Construction workers noted that prior to the construction of the freeway a man could stand in this canyon and touch both sides of the canyon wall.

US-6 rejoins US-50 near Green River. The three routes run concurrent and follow the southern edge of the Book Cliffs to Grand Junction, Colorado. This portion of US-50 is part of the Dinosaur Diamond Prehistoric Highway, a National Scenic Byway. The name of the byway comes from the large number of areas along the route with visible dinosaur remains. The entire route through the state, as well as the concurrencies with I-15 and I-70, is included in the National Highway System.

Photos

History
The modern route of U.S. Route 50 between Ely, Nevada and Green River, Utah is the third iteration.

First iteration
In 1926, when the U.S. Highway system was first announced, there was a gap in US-50 between Ely and Thistle. At the time the states of Utah and Nevada were feuding about which of the old auto trails would be paved and used for the new U.S. Highway System. Nevada favored the Lincoln Highway, which the modern US-50 closely follows in that state. Utah refused to consider the Lincoln Highway west of Salt Lake City. Officials perceived that route would carry all California bound traffic directly to Nevada while passing through very few communities in Utah. Utah instead favored the Victory Highway (modern Interstate 80 west of Salt Lake) and the Arrowhead Trail (modern Interstate 15). By favoring these routes Utah could force travelers destined for southern California to use a different route than those destined for northern California, with both of these traversing through more cities in Utah than the Lincoln Highway. The Arrowhead trail was especially beneficial to Utah as it passed through many communities in the state, but only Las Vegas in Nevada.

Utah prevailed and US-50 did not continue to follow the Lincoln Highway to Salt Lake City as Nevada had wanted. The first continuous route of US-50 across eastern Nevada and western Utah was an arch shaped route. US-50 proceeded north from Ely along what is now numbered U.S. Route 93 and Alternate US-93 where the highway would merge with the Victory Highway (U.S. Route 40 along the Wendover Cut-off, since replaced by I-80) to Salt Lake. From there the highway returned to Green River via what is now numbered State Route 201, U.S. Route 89 and U.S. Route 6.

Second iteration
The second iteration has its origins with the formation of US-6. In 1937, US-6 was extended west from its former terminus at Greeley, Colorado to Long Beach, California. In eastern Utah the route used the existing alignment of US-50. However, in western Utah the route used an unpaved road through Delta reconnecting with US-50 in Ely. In 1953, US-50 was approved to use this shorter alignment with the older US-50 alignment designated as U.S. Route 50 Alternate. Nevada first showed this alignment as paved and signed as US 50 in their 1954 map. With this change, US-6/50 ran concurrent from Ely to Grand Junction, Colorado.

The paved version did not exactly follow the unpaved roads. The dirt route passed through the numerous mountain ranges of the Great Basin using Marjum canyon and Marjum Pass to and through the Tule Valley. Once paved, the route was relocated to follow the north shore of Sevier Lake, which reduced the number of mountain ranges crossed. Although US-50 was moved to yet another alignment, this route remains US-6 today.

Third iteration

The modern route of US-50 was created in 1976. This iteration of US-50 has its origins in a dispute over the route of Interstate 70 in Utah. While I-70 was in the planning stage Colorado lobbied for an extension of the original proposal to run across Colorado and into Utah. Utah supported an extension using then US-6/50 to connect Denver, Colorado with Salt Lake City. However, federal planners did not see value in this route and instead supported a route that could be used to connect Denver with Los Angeles, California. I-70 was built using the federally selected route. In 1976, US-50 was changed again to a routing mostly concurrent with I-70. The portion of modern US-50 between Delta and Scipio had been previously numbered State Route 26, and the portion between Scipio and Salina had been numbered State Route 63, with the SR-63 portion being transferred to SR-26 in 1971.

East of Green River I-70 closely follows the original route of US-50, with some minor straightening by Crescent Junction, Cisco, and Westwater.

Major intersections

References

External links

 Utah
50
Transportation in Millard County, Utah
Transportation in Sevier County, Utah
Transportation in Emery County, Utah
Transportation in Grand County, Utah